DipNote is the official blog of the United States Department of State. It was started on September 25, 2007, with a first post by the U.S. Assistant Secretary of State for Public Affairs Sean McCormack.  DipNote was revised in 2009, with the Departments' 21st Century Statecraft initiative.  DipNote works in conjunction with other public diplomacy programs as part of former Secretary of State Hillary Clinton's smart power initiatives.

Link
DipNote: Official blog of the US Department of State

See also
 State Department Sounding Board
 Diplopedia
 Office of eDiplomacy

References

United States Department of State
Foreign relations of the United States
United States Department of State publications
Bureau of Public Affairs
Internet properties established in 2007
2007 establishments in the United States